Nairn is a town and royal burgh in the Highland council area of Scotland. It is the traditional county town of Nairnshire.

At the 2011 census, Nairn had a population of 9,773, making it the third-largest settlement in the Highland council area, behind Inverness and Fort William. Nairn is best known as a seaside resort, with two golf courses, award-winning beaches, a community centre and arts venue, a small theatre (called The Little Theatre) and one small museum, providing information on the local area and incorporating the collection of the former Fishertown museum.

History

The History of Nairn is a broad and diverse topic spanning its Palaeolithic and Mesolithic roots before recorded history, to the Picts and the visitation of Roman general Agricola. Its possible founding under the name Ekkailsbakki by Sigurd, Earl of Orkney, its royal burgh status under David I, its strong links to monarchs and regents of Scotland and its strategic position in multiple wars and famine.

Geography
Formerly part of the Supercontinent of Rodinia as evidenced by the discovery of Dalradian Supergroup rocks, Nairn encompasses a 2.6 mile by 1.5 mile position on the mouth of the River Nairn and is fronted by the North Sea at the Moray Firth with two extensive beaches. The east beach being predominantly sand with dune vegetation (such as marram grass) and the west having more rock though becoming more sand as it reaches the river mouth. The Cublin Sands  forms part of one of the most extensive areas of stabilised blown sand in Britain. The soil by the coast is largely a thin and loose organic layer developing directly on the sand and this has been strengthened in areas such as Culbin for forestry.

The town itself is predominantly flat rising from sea level to 40 ft in Fishertown and the majority of the town sitting at 65 ft above sea level. Sections of Nairn do reach as high as 95 ft near Balblair. The low ground near the coast is fertile and the soil rich free loam over sand or gravel. In the town thin, rather acidic soils are present throughout. Excavation can reveal dark, muddy glacial deposits, with occasional fossils and shells. 

As the land rises south we see Conifer forests and on the higher slopes we see heather moorland and montane vegetation. The wider Nairnshire and Moray area is 28% woodland, one of the most-wooded areas in Britain.

Nairn is predominantly surrounded gently rolling mounds and hills of mixed-used agricultural and forestry usage upon a glacial landscape. The surrounding areas reaching a height of 620 ft at the Hill of Urchany 3.7 mils south of the town. The land remains fertile and primarily consisting of granite below. The Hydrology of the surrounding area directs water to drain northwards into the River Nairn leaving it prone to flooding. As such the embankments are strengthened in inhabited areas.

Climate

Population

Culture
On 27 May 1960 Nairn's The Regal Ballroom on Leopold Street played host to an act that would go on to become a huge cultural influence on the world of music. A cover band touring Scotland on The Beat Ballad Show Tour with Johnny Gentle as the lead vocalists and featuring three relatively unknown musicians. The founding members of The Beatles. John Lennon, Paul McCartney and George Harrison played under the name The Silver Beetles. The cover acts set list including Raining in My Heart by Buddy Holly and I Need Your Love Tonight by Elvis Presley. The prominent  Ballerina Ballroom of Nairn played host to many famous acts over the years including Pink Floyd and The Who in 1967, Status Quo in 1970, Fleetwood Mac and Slade in 1971. The town continues to hold a musical heart hosting the Nairn International Jazz Festival each August, usually attracting some well-known and world class musicians including Bob Wilber and the Soprano Summit Jazz supergroup.

One link to Nairn's agricultural cultural roots is the Nairn Farmer's Show, better known locally as just the Nairn Show is hosted by the Nairnshire Farming Society as it has been since 1798. The show features livestock competitions of cattle, sheep and horses with trade stands as well as craft and food fairs. Locals produce baked goods, honey, jams and handicrafts such as knitting to be pitted against each other in contest. Many of the people of Nairn have a passion for cooking and this passion is shown in the three day long Taste of Nairn food and drink festival event hosting the World Tattie Scone Championship.

Nairn is home to the Little Theatre, run by the Nairn Drama Club, which was established in 1946. Each year the club produces a number of shows, of varying genres, with the annual Christmas panto being the largest production of all. The Theatre began in dilapidated premises but was rebuilt and reopened in 2004.In 2007 Oscar-winning actress Tilda Swinton, who lives in Nairn, created a film festival entitled "Ballerina Ballroom Cinema of Dreams", which was held in the Nairn Public Hall. It generated worldwide press about the festival and Nairn.

The people of Nairn also appreciate the written arts and is the host for the annual Nairn Book & Arts festival which takes place every year in September at the Nairn Community & Arts Centre. Guests have included authors such as Helen Sedgwick, journalist John Sergeant and royalty guest Camilla, Duchess of Cornwall. The events have included speakers, performers, cinema and readings of local poet Olive Fraser.

Education

Nairn is currently serviced by one secondary school named Nairn Academy located on Duncan Drive in the Tradespark area of Nairn where it has existed since 1976. Prior to this located in the building occupied by the current Rosebank Primary school on Lodgehill Rd. Nairn Academy was founded in 1832 under the name Rose's Academical Institution by Captain James Rose. Prior to Nairn academy other facilities had existed including the preparatory boarding school for boys known under the names Seaforth in 1901 and Alton Burn in 1911. As well as Rosebank Primary school, Nairn is also the location of Millbank Primary school on Millbank Crescent. Nairn Academy also commonly takes students from Cawdor, Croy and Auldearn Primary Schools.

In 1818 we are offered insight into the status of the school facilities by the parish minister.

In 2021 Nairn Academy has been ranked as 204 out of 340 schools based on the percentage of pupils attaining five Highers at 35%. Higher than nearby Inverness High School with 13% and below Inverness Royal Academy with 41% and Charleston Academy Highland with 45%.

Politics

Member of UK Parliament (MP)
In 1617 Nairn selected John Dunbar of Moynes as the Member of Parliament in the Parliament of Scotland for the constituency Nairnshire. This constituency was last represented by John Forbes of Culloden in 1707.

In 1708 following the Acts of Union, 1707, Parliament of Scotland constituency Nairnshire was replaced by a district of burghs constituency of the House of Commons of the Parliament of Great Britain to 1801 and of the Parliament of the United Kingdom. From 1708 to 1918 Nairn was part of the county constituency of Inverness-shire.

The constituency was abolished in 1918 and the Forres and Nairn components were merged into the then new constituency of Moray and Nairn. Moray and Nairn was a county constituency of the House of Commons of the Parliament of the United Kingdom from 1918 to 1983. This was split for the 1983 general election and incorporated into Moray and Inverness, Nairn and Lochaber.

Inverness, Nairn and Lochaber was a county constituency of the House of Commons of the Parliament of the United Kingdom from 1983 to 1997. Inverness East, Nairn and Lochaber, was a county constituency of the House of Commons of the Parliament of the United Kingdom from 1997 to 2005 represented by Labour's David Stewart.

Nairn is currently residing in the Inverness, Nairn, Badenoch and Strathspey constituency of the House of Commons of the UK Parliament. Nairn has been represented by Scottish National Party MP Drew Hendry in the House of Commons of the United Kingdom since 7 May 2015.

Member of Scottish Parliament (MSP)
Founded under the Scotland Act 1998, a devolved Scottish Parliament was legalised placing Nairn into the Scottish Parliament in 1999 as part of the Highland council area and constituency Inverness East, Nairn and Lochaber. Fergus Ewing of the Scottish National Party was elected to represent Nairn in the 1999 Scottish Parliament election as the first Member of the Scottish Parliament (MSP).

Boundaries were redrawn before the 2011 Scottish Parliament election, dividing the area between Inverness and Nairn and Skye, Lochaber and Badenoch. Fergus Ewing was once again elected in the 2011 election and continues to serve.

Local Government
Nairn is represented in ward 18 of the Highland Council area. The head of this burgh or ward council is a provost, the chief magistrate or convener of a burgh, the equivalent of a mayor in other parts of the United Kingdom. The provost of Nairn is Laurie Fraser.

Formed in 1973 the community council is the lowest tier of local government in Scotland. Nairn District Council, was replaced by a larger authority, Highland Council in 1996 and community councils were formed to represent local interests. Nairn is represented by two local community councils. The Nairn West & Suburban Community Council and the Nairn River Community Council.

Religion

During the 2011 census, the majority of responses from Nairn indicated a religious association with the largest group belonging to the Church of Scotland although this group was smaller than those who indicated that they did not follow any religion.

Christianity

Nairn was included traditionally within the diocese of Moray believed to be formed in the reign of Alexander I of Scotland around 1122 which extended from Spey to the River Beauly. A writ in the time of William the Lion shows Bishop of Nairn had given possession of lands in Nairn to King William for the building of Nairn Castle. Implying much of the land of Nairn and the castle had previously belonged to the church or to the Bishop of Moray himself. Possession of Auldearn was provided in compensation.

There are two Church of Scotland congregations in the town. The Old Parish Church, commonly known as Nairn Old Parish Church, is on Academy Street in Nairn erected in 1811, and containing 902 sittings.

A second working building is on the High Street. Nairn St Ninians was opened in 1881 as a Free Church of Scotland and is of an Early French Gothic design, costing £7000 and containing 1200 sittings. In 1900 The Free Church and The United Presbyterian Church united, when it became Nairn High Church. In 1974 The High Church united with The Rosebank Church, and the new congregation appropriately took the name St. Ninian's, the Patron Saint of the Burgh and one pre-eminent in bringing the Gospel to the people of Scotland. This parish extends across most of the town and out towards Auldearn.

St Columba's Episcopal Church is on Queen Street; the church was built of sandstone with a slate roof in 1857 and is still in use. There is also St. Mary's Roman Catholic Church in Academy Street, founded as a result of Gaelic-speaking Roman Catholics who moved from the island of Barra to Nairn in the second half of the 19th. century.

Other worshipping communities include Nairn Baptist Church, Nairn Free Church, and The Pentecostal Church of God.

Islam
Islamic practice within the area can be traced back to before World War Two with nine Muslim graves for the fallen veterans in nearby Kingussie.  Lady Zainab, also known as Lady Evelyn Cobbold and Zainab Cobbold is another local figure of note and daughter of the 7th Earl of Dunmore. Born in 1867 she is the first known British woman to complete the  Hajj pilgrimage to Mecca in 1932 and continued to practice her faith until her death in Inverness in 1963. She was buried in Glencarron in 1963 and in accordance with the principles of Islam.

The number of Muslims noted in the 2011 Census of Scotland is reflective of the lack of Mosque in the town of Nairn. The nearest Mosque being Inverness Mosque, 16 miles west and the next Elgin Mosque 21miles east. In the north of Scotland prayers times can start as early as 2am for Fajr and as 11am for Isha.

Paganism

Paganism, Wicca, or Witchcraft has a long history in Scotland and in Nairn. In nearby Elgin, east of the cathedral exists the Order Pot, a deep pool of water used to test the witches of Nairn up to 1560. Over fifty people were tried and killed within two miles of Nairn including Issobel Nicoll, Margaret Wilsone and Allexander Ledy  in the 16th and 17th century as witches and warlocks.

In 1662 a woman living in nearby Auldearn just two miles from Nairn named Isobel Gowdie was accused and confessed to four counts of Witchcraft and is immortalised in The Confession of Isobel Gowdie, an orchestra piece by composer James MacMillan.

Practices continued into 1848, as a corps creagh was discovered on the bank of the River Nairn near the town itself. A life-sized clay figure filled with needles, placed in such a way that water dipped over its heart. It was said that on the clay dissolving, the man the clay represented would die.

Modern day pagans have formed online groups such as the Scottish Pagan Federation, Highland Pagan Open Circle and East Scotland Heathen Moot which hold Nairnshire residents within their members.

Sports and Athletics

Nairn has a wide range of sporting clubs and activities. The main Nairn Sports Club located on Viewfield Drive offers facilities for weight and cardio training, tennis, squash, table tennis and badminton among other sports. As well as these classes in spinning, pilates and yoga among others. On the coast the Nairn Leisure Centre holds Nairn's only swimming pool as well as indoor and outdoor fitness suites. Nairn hosts the only Synchronised Swimming (Artistic Swimming) club in the north of Scotland.

Most notable of the sporting activities of Nairn is the Nairn Highland Games, a yearly event taking place since 1867, it attracts large crowds of tourists and locals to the town. Events include the more modern half-marathon and traditional Highland games events, the tug-of-war, shot put, highland dancing and tossing the caber. These are the only completely free entry games in Scotland.

Another major entry in the Nairn calendar is the Nairn 10k race. Starting in Nairn High Street and ending back there below the clock tower the course leaves the boundaries of the town and takes runners out into the rural landscape of Nairnshire via its roads. The event also hosts a fun run which is untimed and can be entered by children as young as nine. The event is hosted by the Nairn Road Runners, another of Nairn's athletics clubs. They practice cross country, road running, hill running and ultra distance races. So they can compete themselves staffing of the event is often run by ex-members and volunteers.

The oldest recorded sporting club of Nairn is the Nairn Curling Club established before 1854 as members of the Royal Caledonian Curling Club, the club still hold a complete members' list from 1907 to 2007. 

Nairn has three local football teams Nairn County of Station Park on Balblair Road, who play in the Highland Football League established in 1914 and Nairn St. Ninian, who are members of the Scottish Junior Football Association and are based at Showfield Park. The Nairn St Ninian Women's team was established in 2016 play in the Scottish Women's Football league.

The Nairn County Cricket Club have been members of the North of Scotland Cricket Association since it was founded in 1893. The club plays and hosts at the pavilion in Nairn links and holds a yearly Kwik Cricket Competition for all the schools in the Nairn area with an aim for junior development and encouragement of young people joining the sport.

Nairn is known as a golfing destination, with two 18 hole Championship golf courses. One of these, The Nairn Golf Club was established in 1887. Its designers include Archie Simpson, Old Tom Morris and James Braid. It has hosted many tournaments culminating in the 1999 Walker Cup and was the venue for the 2012 Curtis Cup. The second is Nairn Dunbar Golf Club established in 1899 host of the World One-Arm Golfers Championship, British Seniors Amateur Championship and The 91st Boys Amateur Championship.

Nairn is home to the Nairn St Ninian Bowling club on Viewfield Drive established in May 1961 and a second Nairn Bowling Club, Bowls Scotland Silver Mark accredited club, on Albert Street.

Being on the coast Nairn enjoys easy access to the North sea and as such has had a sailing club since 1968. It has a membership club house at Nairn harbour but that is not the only seafaring club in Nairn. Nairn Coastal Rowing Club organised under The Scottish Coastal Rowing Association was established in 2017 and merged with the Ardersier Boat Club in November 2018 hosting two 22 ft (6.5m) long by 5 ft 8in (1.7m) beam (width) boats. Another modern addition to Nairn's sporting landscape is the Nairn Boxing Club established in 2019 hosting professional boxer Adian Williamson in the High Street gym.

Notable people
Charlie Chaplin, used to holiday every year in Nairn and stayed at the Newton Hotel.
Margaret Fulton, food and cookery author, writer, journalist, author, and commentator. She was the first of this genre of writers in Australia.
James Augustus Grant, who was the first European to discover the outpouring of the White Nile from Lake Victoria, together with Speke was born at Househill, attended Nairn Academy and died at Nairn in 1892.  There is a plaque to his memory in St Paul's Cathedral.
Frances Mary Hendry, author of children's historical fiction, resides in Nairn, where many of her books are set.
Grenville Johnston, Lord Lieutenant of Moray, born here.
Fraser Nelson, editor of The Spectator since 2009, was raised in Nairn.
Tilda Swinton, actress and her children have resided in Nairn since 2007.
David St John Thomas, British author and publisher resided here prior to his death in 2014.
William Whitelaw, the British deputy Prime Minister 1979–88, was born in Nairn and has a street named after his family.
George McCall Smith, notable New Zealand doctor

See also
Nairn Town and County Hospital
Kingsteps
Murder of Alistair Wilson

References

External links

 A Gurn from Nurn with views on politics, culture, upcoming events etc.
 Nairn Scotland Portal offering a guide to visiting and living in the area.
 Nairn River Community Council
 VisitNairn Tourism and visitor information

 
Ports and harbours of Scotland
Royal burghs
County towns in Scotland
Seaside resorts in Scotland
Port cities and towns of the North Sea
Towns in Highland (council area)
Parishes in the County of Nairn